Michael Joseph Copps (born April 23, 1940) is a former Commissioner of the U.S. Federal Communications Commission (FCC), an independent agency of the United States government.  He was sworn in on May 31, 2001 and served until December 31, 2011.  He took on the additional role of acting chairman from January 22, 2009 through June 28, 2009.  He relinquished the chairmanship to Julius Genachowski after Genachowski was confirmed by the U.S. Senate on June 25 and then sworn in on June 29, 2009. He is currently a special adviser to the Media and Democracy Reform Initiative at Common Cause, a nonpartisan citizen advocacy organization.

Biography

Early life, education
Copps was born in Milwaukee, Wisconsin. He was a professor of history at Loyola University New Orleans, from 1967 to 1970. He obtained his B.A. from Wofford College in 1963, where he was elected to Pi Gamma Mu and to Phi Beta Kappa. He completed his Ph.D. in history from the University of North Carolina at Chapel Hill in 1968. He served as chief of staff to Senator Ernest Hollings for almost 12 years before his appointment to the United States Commerce Department as assistant secretary.

FCC Commissioner
He served as one of the commissioners of the FCC from May 31, 2001 to December 31, 2011.  He was acting chair between January 22, 2009, and June 28, 2009.  He relinquished the chairmanship to Julius Genachowski after Genachowski was confirmed by the U.S. Senate on June 25 and then sworn in on June 29, 2009.

Comcast's acquisition of NBC Universal
On January 18, 2011 the FCC and the United States Department of Justice allowed Comcast to buy NBC Universal. Michael Copps was the only commissioner of the FCC to vote against the merger.

He said:

Notes and references

External links

Michael Copps at Sourcewatch
Michael Copps on Democracy Now! 2012-1-12 

1940 births
Living people
Politicians from Milwaukee
Wofford College alumni
University of North Carolina at Chapel Hill alumni
Wisconsin Democrats
Chairmen of the Federal Communications Commission
Recipients of the Four Freedoms Award
Obama administration personnel